The Dictatorial Government of the Philippines was an insurgent government in the Spanish East Indies inaugurated during the Spanish–American War by Emilio Aguinaldo in a public address on May 24, 1898, on his return to the Philippines from exile in Hong Kong, and formally established on June 18. The government was officially a dictatorship with Aguinaldo formally holding the title of "Dictator". The government was succeeded by a revolutionary government which was established by Aguinaldo on June 23.

In 1896, the Philippine Revolution began. In December 1897, the Spanish government and the revolutionaries signed a truce, the Pact of Biak-na-Bato, requiring that the Spanish pay the revolutionaries 800,000 pesos and that Aguinaldo and other leaders go into exile in Hong Kong. In April 1898, at the outbreak of the Spanish–American War, Commodore George Dewey aboard the U.S.S. Olympia sailed from Hong Kong to Manila Bay leading the Asiatic Squadron of the U.S. Navy.  On May 1, 1898, the United States defeated the Spanish in the Battle of Manila Bay. Emilio Aguinaldo decided to return to the Philippines to help American forces defeat the Spaniards. The U.S. Navy agreed to transport him back aboard the USS McCulloch, and on May 19, he arrived in Cavite.

Philippine declaration of independence and establishment of Philippine governments

On June 12, 1898, Aguinaldo proclaimed the independence of the Philippines at his house in Cavite El Viejo. Ambrosio Rianzares Bautista wrote the Philippine Declaration of Independence, and read this document in Spanish that day at Aguinaldo's house. On June 18, Aguinaldo issued a decree formally establishing his dictatorial government. On June 23, Aguinaldo issued another decree, this time replacing the dictatorial government with a revolutionary government (and naming himself as president).

Writing retrospectively in 1899, Aguinaldo claimed that an American naval officer had urged him to return to the Philippines to fight the Spanish and said: "The United States is a great and rich nation and needs no colonies." Aguinaldo also wrote that after checking with Dewey by telegraph, U.S. Consul E. Spencer Pratt had assured him in Singapore: "That the United States would at least recognize the independence of the Philippines under the protection of the United States Navy. The consul added that there was no necessity for entering into a formal written agreement because the word of the Admiral and of the United States Consul were, in fact, equivalent to the most solemn pledge that their verbal promises and assurance would be fulfilled to the letter and were not to be classed with Spanish promises or Spanish ideas of a man’s word of honour." Aguinaldo received nothing in writing.

On April 28 Pratt wrote to United States Secretary of State William R. Day, explaining the details of his meeting with Aguinaldo: 

There was no mention in the cablegrams between Pratt and Dewey of independence or indeed of any conditions on which Aguinaldo was to cooperate, these details being left for future arrangement with Dewey. Pratt had intended to facilitate the occupation and administration of the Philippines, and also to prevent a possible conflict of action. In a communication written on July 28, Pratt made the following statement: 

On June 16, Secretary Day cabled Consul Pratt: "Avoid unauthorized negotiations with the Philippine insurgents," and later on the same day: 

Filipino scholar Maximo Kalaw wrote in 1927: "A few of the principal facts, however, seem quite clear. Aguinaldo was not made to understand that, in consideration of Filipino cooperation, the United States would extend its sovereignty over the Islands, and thus in place of the old Spanish master a new one would step in. The truth was that nobody at the time ever thought that the end of the war would result in the retention of the Philippines by the United States."

Notes

References

 
 
 
 
 
 
 
 

1898 in the Philippines
Military dictatorships